Bransford was an unincorporated community, in Tarrant County, located in the U.S. state of Texas. It was since renamed Colleyville, for Dr. Lilburn Howard Colley, who came to the area in 1880.

References

Unincorporated communities in Tarrant County, Texas
Unincorporated communities in Texas